Sataon is a village and corresponding community development block in Rae Bareli district, Uttar Pradesh, India. It is located a bit to the west of the river Sai on the main Raebareli-Unnao road. It is 22 km from Raebareli, the district headquarters. As of 2011, its population is 9,151, in 1,756 households. It has 4 primary schools and 1 medical clinic.

Sataon hosts two annual festivals dedicated to the worship of Parvati Devi. The larger one is on Vaisakha Badi 3. Vendors bring metal utensils, earthenware pottery, bangles, and toys to sell at the festival. The other festival is held on Asvina Sudi 10 and is much smaller; vendors bring earthenware pottery, bangles, and various everyday items to sell.

History 
Along with Korihar, Sataon historically gave its name to a large taluqdari estate called Korihar Sataon, which was held by a branch of the Bais Rajputs. This branch was founded by Pahar Singh, one of the eight sons of Rana Doman Deo of Khajurgaon. Along with his brother Mitrajit Singh, ancestor of the taluqdars of Pahu, Pahar Singh accompanied Aurangzeb on his expedition to Kandahar, and both brothers died in an avalanche in 1647. Ten generations later, the taluqdar Gur Bakhsh Singh died childless, and his territories were seized by Rana Raghunath Singh of Khajurgaon until 1832. At that point, Gur Bakhsh Singh's adopted son Fateh Bahadur was able to recover the taluqa with the aid of Beni Madho Bakhsh of Shankarpur. Beni Madho Bakhsh himself then attempted to take over the taluqa via security interest, but the British agent William Henry Sleeman interfered and Fateh Bahadur ended up again recovering the taluqa by paying off a debt of Rs. 40,000. His descendants maintained possession of the estate into the 20th century.

At the turn of the 20th century, Sataon was described as a very large village with extensive orchards; it had a primary school and a ruined fort built by Fateh Bahadur Singh. The two fairs to Parvati were noted, with attendance listed as about 3,000 people, and with plenty of commerce in various local products, especially carts and metal vessels, taking place at the events. The population of Sataon in 1901 was 2,964 people, and a large proportion of residents belonged to the Lodh community.

The 1961 census recorded Sataon as comprising 9 hamlets, with a total population of 3,872 people (1,975 male and 1,897 female), in 777 households and 697 physical houses. The area of the village was given as 2,809 acres and it had a medical practitioner and post office at that point. Average attendance of the Parvati Devi festival in Vaisakha was then about 15,000 people. Attendance to the Asvina one was 500. It had 5 grain mills, 5 bicycle repair shops, and 1 small manufacturer/repairer not assignable to any group.

The 1981 census recorded Sataon as having a population of 5,690 people, in 100 households, and having an area of 1,136.80 hectares. The main staple foods were given as wheat and rice.

Villages 
Sataon CD block has the following 72 villages:

References 

Villages in Raebareli district
Community development blocks in India
Former zamindari estates in Uttar Pradesh